Smederevo–Vršac dialect (Serbo-Croatian: Latin: Smederevsko-vršački dijalekat, Cyrillic: Смедеревско-вршачки дијалекат) is a subdialect of the Shtokavian dialect of Serbo-Croatian. As an Old Shtokavian variety, it retains a number of features not found in Neo-Shtokavian varieties on which standards of Serbo-Croatian are based.

Distribution
The dialect is mainly spoken in Serbia or more exactly in north-eastern part of Šumadija (between Smederevo and Kragujevac), part of Belgrade, western part of eastern Serbia around Požarevac and Veliko Gradište, and south-eastern part of Vojvodina (south-eastern Banat including the city of Vršac). Some of the speakers could be also found in eastern Banat, in Romania where it is not in use anymore.

History
The Smederevo–Vršac dialect is a mixed speech of populations that speak Šumadija–Vojvodina and Kosovo–Resava dialects.  It is, however, linguistically closer to the Kosovo–Resava dialect and it is sometimes classified as a sub-dialect of the Kosovo–Resava dialect.

In the past, Smederevo–Vršac dialect was spoken in much larger area.

See also
Serbian language

References

External links
Narečja i dijalekti srpskog jezika / Dialects of the Serbian language (in Serbian)

Dialects of Serbo-Croatian
Serbian dialects